Peter Mast (born 23 January 1957) is a retired Swiss football defender.

References

1957 births
Living people
Swiss men's footballers
BSC Young Boys players
FC Bern players
FC Chiasso players
Swiss Super League players
Association football defenders